William Funnell ISO (8 June 189125 October 1962) was a senior Australian public servant, best known for his time as head of the Department of Labour and National Service between 1946 and 1952.

Life and career
Funnell was born 8 June 1891 in Goulburn, New South Wales to parents William Funnell and Jessie Anne Funnell, née Worchurst. He attended South Goulburn Public School before joining the New South Wales Government Railways and Tramways office in 1906 as an apprentice clerk.

In March 1946, Funnell was appointed as Secretary of the Department of Labour and National Service.

Funnell died on 25 October 1962 in Castlecrag, Sydney.

Awards
Funnell was made a companion of the Imperial Service Order in June 1954 in recognition of his public service.

References

1891 births
1962 deaths
Australian public servants
Australian Companions of the Imperial Service Order